Vater Percussion is an American manufacturing company based in Holbrook, Massachusetts. The company has always focused on percussion instruments, producing drum sticks, brushes and mallets. It was founded by Jack Adams, and is now run by his two grandsons Ron, Alan Vater. 

Although the company began producing sticks in 1956, it did not officially become "Vater Percussion" until much later.

History 
The first sticks made by "Vater" were made by Jack Adams and Ron and Alan's godfather Fred Maichle in Jacks Drum Shop in Boston, Massachusetts. Jacks was one of the first shops to offer custom models, and began producing custom models for Buddy Rich, Philly Joe Jones and Elvin Jones. In the early to mid-1980s what would become Vater began manufacturing drumsticks for Vic Firth  and Zildjian Cymbals. On 22 October 1988, Vater moved their factory to Holbrook, Massachusetts. Three years later the first Vater drumsticks were introduced at a Percussive Arts Society show..

Vater guarantees their sticks to be "straighter, more consistent and of higher quality than all other leading drumstick manufacturers". Vater sticks typically have a higher moisture content than other drumsticks, which is intended to create more durable drumsticks, though this does result in a slightly heavier stick.

Besides drum sticks, Vater also manufactures a variety of timpani mallets, marimba mallets, vibraphone mallets, brushes, specialty sticks, silence mutes, stick bags, drink holders, educational products and other accessories.

Notable Vater Artists include:

Vinnie Colaiuta

Chad Smith of Red Hot Chili Peppers

Stewart Copeland of The Police

Mike Mangini of Dream Theater

Jay Weinberg of Slipknot

Max Weinberg of Bruce Springsteen

Deen Castronovo of Journey

Drumeo

Scott Travis of Judas Priest

Morgan Rose of Sevendust

Victor Indrizzo

Matt Chamberlain 

Taylor Gordon (The Pocket Queen)

Tim Alexander of Primus

John Cowsill of The Beach Boys

Mike Wengren of Disturbed

Frank Ferrer of Guns N' Roses

Steven Adler of Guns N' Roses

Sasha Berliner (Jazz Vibraphonist)

Fred Eltringham of Sheryl Crow

Matt McGuire of The Chainsmokers

Chad Sexton of 311

Mona Tavakoli of Jason Mraz

Taku Hirano of Fleetwood Mac

Ilan Rubin of Nine Inch Nails

Roy Mayorga of Stone Sour

Nathan Followill of Kings of Leon

Brian Frasier Moore of Justin Timberlake

Sean Kinney of Alice In Chains

Glen Sobel of Alice Cooper

References

External links
 Official website
 Alan Vater Interview NAMM Oral History Library (2021)

Percussion instrument manufacturing companies
Musical instrument manufacturing companies of the United States